Herman van Loon (19 January 1910 – 4 December 1981) was a Dutch footballer. He played in one match for the Netherlands national football team in 1929.

References

External links
 

1910 births
1981 deaths
Dutch footballers
Netherlands international footballers
Place of birth missing
Association footballers not categorized by position